Boutheina Jabnoun Marai (Tunisian Arabic: بثينة جبنون مرعي) is a Tunisian journalist and magazine publisher. She is the co-owner and the editor-in-chief of Bouthaina magazine. She currently resides in Abu Dhabi, the United Arab Emirates.

References 

Living people
Tunisian women journalists
Year of birth missing (living people)
21st-century Tunisian women writers
21st-century Tunisian writers